Upmala Parish is an administrative unit of Preiļi Municipality, Latvia. From 2009 until 2021, it was part of the former Vārkava Municipality

History 
Upmalas village was formed in 1975 from the liquidated part of Stradiņi village and Vārkava village. In 1977 part of Upmala village was added to Rožkalnu village. In 1979, part of the Rauniešu village area was added to Upmalas village. The village was reorganized into a parish in 1990. In 2002, Upmala Parish merged with Rožkalnu Parish to form Vārkava Municipality.

References 

 

Parishes of Latvia
Preiļi Municipality
Latgale